Safaree Lloyd Samuels (born July 4, 1981) is a Jamaican-American rapper. Samuels started his musical career in the group the Hoodstars in the early 2000s alongside American rapper Nicki Minaj. Samuels is also known as a solo artist. In 2016, he joined the cast of the VH1 reality show, Love & Hip Hop: Hollywood. In 2017, he moved back to his hometown of New York City and joined the Love & Hip Hop: New York cast.

Early life 
Safaree Lloyd Samuels was born to immigrant Jamaican parents in the Brooklyn borough of New York City on July 4, 1981. He has two sisters, Shaneequa and Samantha Samuels. He attended Midwood High School.

Career 
Samuels started his musical career in the group the Hoodstars, formed in the early 2000s with rappers Nicki Minaj, Lou$tar, and Seven Up. In 2004, the group recorded the entrance song for WWE Diva Victoria, "Don't Mess With", which was featured on the compilation album ThemeAddict: WWE The Music, Vol.6. After the group disbanded, Minaj started her solo career and Samuels supported her as a hype man.

In 2012, he appeared in Minaj's music video "Stupid Hoe". In 2012, Minaj released her second album, Pink Friday: Roman Reloaded, where Samuels  has six writing credits and was featured on the track "Press Conference".

In 2015, Samuels released the mixtapes, It Is What It Is and It Is What It Is, Vol. 2. In early 2016, he made appearance in the second season of K. Michelle: My Life. In May 2016, it was announced that Samuels will join the cast of VH1 reality show, Love & Hip Hop: Hollywood's third season, which premiered in August 2016. In July 2016, he released a new mixtape titled Real Yard Vibes. In August 2017, it was announced that Samuels would compete in the first season of VH1's Scared Famous, which premiered in October 2017.

In February 2018, Samuels was honored with a Blue & Bougie Impact Award. In the same month, a nude picture and video of Samuels was leaked online. In 2019, Safaree debuted the "Anaconda" line of dildos molded from his own penis. In 2020, Safaree launched an OnlyFans account sharing his amateur pornographic videos for $20 per month.

Personal life 

Samuels dated rapper Nicki Minaj from 2000 until their breakup in 2014. Several tracks on Minaj's third album The Pinkprint are believed to have been inspired by the end of their relationship. In 2016, he attempted to sue Minaj and accused her of not crediting him on The Pinkprint.

He became engaged to model, TV personality and actress Erica Mena on Christmas Eve 2018. The couple married on October 7, 2019. On February 3, 2020, Samuels and Mena welcomed their daughter. On May 4, 2021, he announced that he and Mena were expecting their second child together. On May 25, 2021, TMZ reported that Mena officially filed for divorce from Samuels. On June 28, 2021, he announced the arrival of their second child, a boy. 
He is currently in a relationship with model Kimbella Matos.

Discography

Mixtapes

Studio albums

Filmography

Television

References

External links 
 
 

1981 births
Living people
American rappers of Jamaican descent
Songwriters from New York (state)
Television personalities from New York City
Participants in American reality television series
21st-century American rappers
21st-century American male musicians
People from Marine Park, Brooklyn
African-American male rappers
Jamaican rappers
African-American songwriters
21st-century African-American musicians
20th-century African-American people
American male songwriters
OnlyFans creators